Jim Calder (born 29 July 1960) is a Scottish retired professional footballer. Calder played as a striker until he received a knee ligament injury at the age of 26. He then played as a goalkeeper, a highly unusual change given the specialist nature of that position.

Best known for his time with Inverness Caledonian Thistle, where he played from the club's formation in 1994 until 2002. Calder had been inherited from the squad of Inverness Thistle, who had merged with local rivals Caledonian to form the new club. Calder's goalkeeping antics and spectacular saves made him a firm favourite with Caley fans. His best match was probably in 2000 when he turned out a man of the match performance in Caley Thistle's famous 3–1 Scottish Cup victory over Celtic. Two seasons later Jim left Caley Thistle after the club signed Mark Brown.

Jim then signed for Nairn County, playing 51 times for the club. After leaving County in 2005, he took up short-term contracts at several Highland League clubs, including Clach, Rothes and Forres Mechanics. As late as 2007 the 46-year-old Calder even made an appearance in the Scottish Football League for Peterhead. He has also returned to Caley Thistle to coach their youth teams.

References

1960 births
Living people
People from Badenoch and Strathspey
Sportspeople from Highland (council area)
Scottish footballers
Association football goalkeepers
Inverness Thistle F.C. players
Inverness Caledonian Thistle F.C. players
Nairn County F.C. players
Clachnacuddin F.C. players
Rothes F.C. players
Forres Mechanics F.C. players
Inverurie Loco Works F.C. players
Peterhead F.C. players
Scottish Football League players
Highland Football League players